Woo-jin is a Korean unisex given name. Its meaning differs based on the hanja used to write each syllable of the given name. There are 41 hanja with the reading "woo" and 43 hanja with the reading "jin" on the South Korean government's official list of hanja which may be registered for use in given names. In 2008, Woo-jin was the fifth-most popular name for baby boys in South Korea, with 1,811 being given the name that year.

People with this name include:

Entertainers
Jo Woo-jin (actor) (born 1979), South Korean actor
Noh Woo-jin (born 1980), South Korean comedian
Yeon Woo-jin (born Kim Bong-hoe, 1984), South Korean actor
Oh Woo-jin (born 1991), South Korean actor
Kim Woo-jin (singer) (born 1997), South Korean singer, former member of Stray Kids
Park Woo-jin (born 1999), South Korean singer, member of Wanna One and AB6IX
Seo Woo-jin (born 2015), South Korean child actor

Sportspeople
Lee Woo-jin (footballer) (born 1986), South Korean football centre-back
Jo Woo-jin (footballer, born 1987), South Korean football midfielder
Hwang Woo-jin (born 1990), South Korean modern pentathlete
Kim Woo-jin (archer) (born 1992), South Korean archer
Jang Woo-jin (born 1995), South Korean table tennis player

Other
Pi Woo-jin (born 1956), South Korean female army helicopter pilot
Christopher Yoo (chess player) (full name Christopher Woojin Yoo, born 2006), American chess player

Fictional characters
Lee Woo-jin, in 2003 South Korean film Oldboy

Companies
 Woojin Industrial Systems, a South Korean train manufacturer

See also
List of Korean given names

References

Korean masculine given names